The CIS men's national under-20 basketball team was a national basketball team of the Commonwealth of Independent States. It represented the country in men's international under-20 basketball competitions. The team finished in 7th place at the 1992 FIBA Europe Under-20 Championship.

Team results

See also
Soviet Union men's national basketball team
Soviet Union men's national under-18 basketball team

References

Men's national under-20 basketball teams